"Overnight Sensation" is a song written by Bob McDill, and recorded by American country music artist Mickey Gilley. It was released in December 1975 as the second and final single and title track from Gilley's album Overnight Sensation.  The song reached number 7 on the Billboard Hot Country Singles chart and number 4 on the RPM Country Tracks chart in Canada.

Content
The song tells the story of a woman who is irresistible to men.

Other versions
Barbara Mandrell and Steve Wariner recorded the song on the former's 1983 album Spun Gold.

Chart performance

References

1975 singles
1975 songs
Mickey Gilley songs
Barbara Mandrell songs
Steve Wariner songs
Songs written by Bob McDill
Song recordings produced by Eddie Kilroy
Playboy Records singles